Peter Marchant may refer to:
Peter Marchant (archer) (born 1961), Australian Paralympic archer
Peter Marchant (sport shooter) (1920–1977), British sports shooter
Pierre Marchant (1585–1661), Flemish Franciscan